The Bubble System is an arcade system board designed by Konami and used across many arcade games in 1985.

Konami announced coin-op arcade video games for the system on January 12, 1985. The Bubble System introduced a unique new form of data storage for arcade-style video games. It used bubble memory cartridges, a sort of non-mechanical magnetic storage system. It was said to have a higher reliability than mechanical floppy disks or tape drives.

Konami used a modified version of their new G400 BIOS for this project. The main CPU was a Motorola 68000 at 10 MHz. There was a separate Zilog Z80 for sound control, which drove two AY-3-8910s, a custom Konami SCC (K005289), and a Sanyo VLM5030 speech synthesizer. It had a Scramble wiring harness.

Bubble Software can be identified by its booting sequence. First, a synthesized voice speaks the phrase "Presented by Konami. Getting ready", followed by a countdown from fifty (which often ends before reaching zero). The screen then starts displaying video and a screen with the text "WARMING UP NOW - PRESENTED BY KONAMI", accompanied with a second countdown timer and a small musical tune (called the "Morning Music") appears. Despite what the screen says, the heating process takes place during the voice-based countdown stage (which is of variable length and is temperature-dependent), while the loading process happens during the (fixed-length) on-screen countdown stage.

The Bubble System became a commercial failure. It was considerably more expensive than ROM chip-based boards and extremely sensitive to electromagnetic fields that could render the game unplayable. Most games on this system were eventually ported to standard ROM chips, and it was discontinued.

Konami has made homages to the Bubble System in several games; with the Morning Music being one of the playable tracks in Keyboardmania and NOSTALGIA, and the intro of Konami Classics Series: Arcade Hits featuring the song too.

Bubble System games
Gradius (ported to ROM chips as Nemesis for overseas distribution)
TwinBee
Galactic Warriors
Konami RF2 (ported to ROM chips as Konami GT for overseas distribution)

See also
Konami GX400

References

 System16.com: Bubble System hardware

Konami arcade system boards
68k-based arcade system boards